Hagiga Mosby (born 12 June 2000) is an Australian rugby league footballer who plays as a er for the Brisbane Broncos in the NRL Women's Premiership.

She previously played rugby union for the Queensland Reds in the Super W.

Background
Born on Thursday Island, Mosby played for the North Queensland Cowboys NRL Touch Premiership team in 2018 before switching to rugby union. Her uncle, Gideon Gela-Mosby, played three seasons with the Cowboys in the NRL.

Playing career
In 2019, Mosby played for the University of Queensland at the AON Uni sevens competition and represented Australia at the 2019 Oceania Women's Sevens Championship. In 2020, she joined the Queensland Reds in the Super W.

In December 2021, Mosby switched to rugby league, signing with the Brisbane Broncos.

In Round 2 of the 2021 NRL Women's season, Mosby made her debut for the Broncos, scoring a try in a win over the Newcastle Knights.

References

External links
Brisbane Broncos profile

2000 births
Living people
Indigenous Australian rugby league players
Australian female rugby league players
Australian female rugby union players
Rugby league wingers
Brisbane Broncos (NRLW) players
21st-century Australian women